Muhammad al-Shurafi (born 1940) is a Yemeni poet and playwright. He was born in Hajja Governorate and studied at Cairo University. Subsequently he joined the Yemeni foreign service. al-Shurafi has published more than twenty books, including poetry collections (Women's Tears, To Her I Sing), plays and verse plays (In the Land of Two Edens, Seasons of Migration and Madness). His poetry is notable for its engagement with social issues, particularly that of women's rights.

al-Shurafi's poetry has been translated into English and was represented in a 1988 anthology on modern Arabian literature (edited by Salma Khadra Jayyusi).

References

Yemeni poets
1940 births
Living people
Yemeni expatriates in Egypt
People from Hajjah Governorate